Call of the West is the second studio album by Los Angeles rock band Wall of Voodoo, released in September 1982. The album contains "Mexican Radio", the group's most well-known song, which was released as a single and whose video received moderate airplay on MTV.

Critical reception 

In a 1982 Trouser Press review, Jon Young said, "[t]hey're dealing in pure hokum, for sure, but Wall of Voodoo has become very good at it. Atmosphere is all in these muttered tales of desperation and weirdness, suggesting Devo on a bad trip of no return. But Call of the West doesn't repel; it's spooky halloweenish fun."

Track listing
All music composed by Wall of Voodoo. All lyrics composed by Stan Ridgway.

Side one
 "Tomorrow" – 3:03
 "Lost Weekend" – 4:59
 "Factory" – 5:33
 "Look at Their Way" – 3:18
 "Hands of Love" – 3:54

Side two
 "Mexican Radio" – 4:11
 "Spy World" – 2:41
 "They Don't Want Me" – 4:31
 "On Interstate 15" – 2:44
 "Call of the West" – 5:59

The original cassette release of the album features a bonus track called "Exercise" at the end of side one, following "Hands of Love".

In 2009, Australian label Raven Records reissued Call of the West and the first Wall of Voodoo album, Dark Continent, together on one CD, featuring a full color booklet with liner notes by Ian McFarlane. Both albums were digitally remastered.

Personnel
Wall of Voodoo
Joe Nanini – percussion, drums, voice
Stanard Ridgway – vocals, words, harmonica, keyboards
Chas T. Gray – synthesizer, bass, backing vocals
Marc Moreland – 6- and 12-string guitars

Additional musicians
Louie Rivera – percussion
Richard Mazda – rhythm machine programming, bass guitars

Technical
Richard Mazda – producer
Jess Sutcliffe – engineer, mixing
Robert Battaglia – mixing
Avi Kipper – mixing
Frank De Luna – mastering
Stanard Ridgway – cover concept, design
Scott Lindgren – cover concept
Francis Delia – design, photography
Paul Peterson – production design
Stephen Sayadian – styling
Carl Grasso – art direction, layout
Marc Moreland – printing

Charts
Album

Singles

References

External links
  Raven Records page for Dark Continent/Call of the West

Wall of Voodoo albums
1982 albums
I.R.S. Records albums
Illegal Records albums
Albums produced by Richard Mazda